Stephen M. Ryder (born 1943, in Monticello, New York) is an American journalist, poet, screenwriter and producer.

Filmography

References

External links

 Article in Film Freak Central

1943 births
Living people
People from Monticello, New York
American male screenwriters
Film producers from New York (state)
Screenwriters from New York (state)